Luo Jialun (December 21, 1897 - December 25, 1969), was the former Chinese Minister of Education, historian, diplomat and political activist. A noted scholar, he was one of the leaders of the May Fourth Movement in 1919. Subsequently, being distinguished as President of various prestigious Chinese universities in the interwar period. In the fall of 1946 he was appointed by the Nationalist Government as China's first Ambassador to India, a full year before India gained sovereignty from the United Kingdom/British Empire. His tenure as Ambassador saw the escalation of the Chinese Civil War and subsequent retreat to Taiwan, of the Nationalist Forces under Chiang Kai-Shek, from whom the Indian Government withdrew diplomatic recognition, according it instead to the victorious Communists under Mao Zedong. Luo remained in India till 1952 when he rejoined his family on Taiwan, where
they had retreated with the Nationalists. He continued to live there in his retirement.

On May 29, 2018, the asteroid 204711 Luojialun was named in his honor.

In January 2022, the University of Michigan received a calligraphy collection valued at $12 million as a donation from Jialun's family, making it the largest art donation in the university's history to date

Biography
Luo Jialun was born on December 21, 1897, in Kiangsi to a moderately prosperous family. An industrious and precocious student, he graduated from Peking University in the arts, and subsequently undertook intensive research work in history and philosophy at Princeton, Columbia, London, Berlin and Paris Universities. Returning to China he assumed a prominent role in the  "Literary Revolution of 1918 and subsequent May Fourth Movement in 1919 where as through his editorship of the respected journal The Renaissance. Joining the University of Peking he rose to become professor of history in 1926. In 1928 he was appointed President of Tsinghua University serving until 1930.

References

Educators from Jiangxi
1897 births
1969 deaths
Politicians from Nanchang
National University of Peking alumni
Princeton University alumni
Columbia University alumni
Alumni of the University of London
Humboldt University of Berlin alumni
University of Paris alumni
Presidents of Tsinghua University
Presidents of National Central University
Presidents of Nanjing University
Republic of China historians
Republic of China politicians from Jiangxi
Kuomintang politicians in Taiwan
20th-century Chinese historians
Chinese Civil War refugees
Taiwanese people from Jiangxi
Historians from Jiangxi